Ivesia sericoleuca is a species of flowering plant in the rose family known by the common name Plumas mousetail, or Plumas ivesia.

Distribution
The plant is endemic to eastern California, in the Northern Sierra Nevada and onto the southern Modoc Plateau.

Description
Ivesia sericoleuca is a small perennial herb forming a tuft on the ground. Each leaf is a flat to cylindrical strip of many hairy green leaflets, each individual leaflet 3 to 15 millimeters long and each whole leaf 10 to 20 centimeters long.

It bears an inflorescence of several clusters of hairy flowers. Each flower is just over a centimeter wide, with triangular reddish-green or yellowish sepals and round to spoon-shaped white petals. In the center of the flower are usually 20 stamens and several pistils.

References

External links
Calflora Database:  Ivesia sericoleuca (Plumas ivesia,  Plumas mousetail)
Jepson Manual eFlora (TJM2) treatment of Ivesia sericoleuca
UC CalPhotos gallery of Ivesia sericoleuca

sericoleuca
Endemic flora of California
Flora of the Sierra Nevada (United States)
~
~
~